Para Todos (Spanish for "For Everyone") is a regional Spanish language magazine in the United States. Published by Silvia Ichar, the magazine reaches Southern California Latinos through its local distribution, as well as subscription base. Para Todos was launched in San Juan Capistrano, California in 1995 as a community magazine for South Orange County, but eventually became a publication with much more content than what was originally intended, and has gone on to be the leading Spanish language regional magazine of Southern California.

The content of the magazine is intended to be for women (79% of its readers are women), addressing them in a respectable manner and serving as a guide for small businesses, fashion, culture, community events, health, beauty and much more.

The main headquarters of Para Todos are still in San Juan Capistrano. However, the publication now reaches distribution through Los Angeles. Para Todos has a readership of 400,000 per issue and a subscription base of 5,000, making it the only Spanish language California magazine with a subscription option.

In January 2011 their website Paratodos.com reached its most successful month online with a record 15.9 million web hits.

Awards
Silvia Ichar has won several awards for her work on Para Todos:
2000 - Small Business Estrella Award from the Hispanic Chamber of Commerce of Orange County 
2009 - Small Business Journalist of the Year from the Small Business Administration
2010 - Journalist of the Year - Hispanic Public Relations Association

References

External links

1995 establishments in California
Magazines established in 1995
Magazines published in California
Spanish-language magazines
Spanish-language mass media in California
Women's magazines published in the United States